The Elie Saab net dress of Halle Berry refers to the mesh and embroidery-topped deep-red dress worn by American actress Halle Berry to the 74th Academy Awards on March 24, 2002. It was designed by Lebanese designer Elie Saab.

In a poll by Debenhams published in The Daily Telegraph the dress was voted the eighth greatest red carpet gown of all time. Cosmopolitan cited the dress as one of the Best Oscar dresses of all time, saying, "Probably one of the best-known Oscar dresses of all time, it shows off Halle's best parts, while the strategic embroidering still leaves something to the imagination. There's a lot of material on the bottom half, but it doesn't swallow her up or hide the shape of her legs." Varietys Complete Book of Oscar Fashion placed it among their selections for the Oscar's most beautiful gowns, noting that she had "fashion critics raving for days" with the dress forming a "dramatic counterpoint to Berry's fresh, good looks."

See also
 List of individual dresses

References

2000s fashion
Outfits worn at the Academy Awards ceremonies
2002 clothing
Red dresses